Jeffery Raymond Jones (born May 30, 1972) is a former American football offensive tackle who played two seasons for the Detroit Lions in 1995 and in 1996. He also played for the BC Lions in 1998.

References

1972 births
Detroit Lions players
Players of American football from Texas
American football offensive tackles
Texas A&M Aggies football players
Living people
BC Lions players